Iván Blanco (born September 24, 1983 in Caracas, Venezuela) is a Venezuelan former professional baseball pitcher.

Blanco signed as an undrafted free agent with the Seattle Mariners in 2000.  He represented Venezuela national baseball team in the 2009 World Baseball Classic.

External links

1983 births
Living people
Arizona League Mariners players
Baseball pitchers
Cardenales de Lara players
Everett AquaSox players
High Desert Mavericks players
Inland Empire 66ers of San Bernardino players
Québec Capitales players
Baseball players from Caracas
Tiburones de La Guaira players
Venezuelan expatriate baseball players in Canada
Venezuelan expatriate baseball players in the United States
Winnipeg Goldeyes players
Wisconsin Timber Rattlers players
World Baseball Classic players of Venezuela
2009 World Baseball Classic players